Japanese rock band One Ok Rock has released thirty-five music videos and fourteen video albums. The band and its music have also appeared in various television shows, commercials, and films.

Music videos

Video albums

Filmography

Films

Television

Commercials

See also
 One Ok Rock discography

References

External links 
 

Videography
Videographies of Japanese artists